Monika Grimm (born 18 May 1940, in Schönfels bei Zwickau) is a German pop singer and actress.

References

1940 births
Living people
People from Zwickau (district)
German women pop singers
German actresses